A block settlement (or bloc settlement) is a particular type of land distribution which allows settlers with the same ethnicity to form small colonies. This settlement type was used throughout western Canada between the late 19th and early 20th centuries. Some were planned and others were spontaneously created by the settlers themselves. As a legacy of the block settlements, the three Prairie Provinces have several regions where ancestries other than British are the largest, unlike the norm in surrounding regions. 

The policy of planned blocks was pursued primarily by Clifford Sifton during his time as Interior Minister of Canada. It was essentially a compromise position. Some politicians wanted all ethnic groups to be scattered evenly though the new lands to ensure they would quickly assimilate to Anglo-Canadian culture, while others did not want to live near "foreign" immigrants (as opposed to British immigrants who were not considered foreign) and demanded that they be segregated. At the time, Canada was receiving large numbers of non-British, non-French, immigrants for the first time, especially Italians, Germans, Scandinavians, and Ukrainians. The newcomers themselves wanted to settle as close as possible to people with a familiar language and similar customs. The government did not want the West to be fragmented into a few large homogeneous ethnic blocks, however. So several smaller colonies were set up where particular ethnic groups could settle, but these were spaced across the country.

American

African American

Mormon 

Cardston founded in 1887 was the first Latter-day Saint settlement in Alberta.

Anabaptist

Hutterite
Hutterites are German-speaking Anabaptists who live in communal agricultural colonies. They have 188 colonies in Alberta, 117 in Manitoba, 72 in Saskatchewan and 3 in British Columbia. These Canadian colonies began with 18 colonies founded in 1919. Map

Mennonite 
The Manitoba government set aside the Mennonite East Reserve now in the Rural Municipality of Hanover and the Mennonite West Reserve now in the Rural Municipality of Rhineland and the Rural Municipality of Stanley for the new Russian Mennonite immigrants coming to the province beginning in 1874. Most spoke Mennonite Low German. (Map)

Mennonite communities originally part of the East Reserve, Manitoba include:

Mennonite communities originally part of the West Reserve, Manitoba include:

Mennonite communities originally part of the Scratching River Settlement, Manitoba include:

Saskatchewan settlements (Map)

Early Alberta settlements began in La Crete, Alberta and Didsbury, Alberta 1901

Early British Columbia settlements began in Yarrow, British Columbia and Abbotsford, British Columbia 1911

British
Meaning: people coming directly from the United Kingdom, not English-speaking people from Ontario or Atlantic Canada.

British Canadian 
Meaning: settlers from Eastern Canada, primarily Ontario, and mostly of British and Irish origins.

Dutch

Eastern European

Ashkenazi 

Many of the Jewish immigrants to Canada came from settlements in Eastern Europe, including Austria-Hungary and the Russian Empire (later the Soviet Union).

Doukhobor 

In Saskatchewan Doukhobors, numbering 7,500, settled in three blocks in the North-West Territories (now in Saskatchewan) from 1899 to 1918. (Map)

British Columbia (1908-1938) (Map) 

Alberta

Finnish

Hungarian

Old Believers

Romanian

Ukrainian

Ukrainian settlements with approximate date of founding (Map):
 Edna-Star, Alberta (1892). Founded by the original Ukrainian Canadian pioneers Iwan Pylypow and Wasyl Eleniak, this is the oldest and largest of the Ukrainian block settlements and was once considered the largest Ukrainian community in the world outside Eastern Europe. It is now the world's largest eco-museum, called Kalyna Country, which includes Sturgeon County, Thorhild County, the County of St. Paul No. 19, the County of Vermilion River, the County of Two Hills No. 21, the County of Minburn No. 27, Beaver County, Lamont County, and Strathcona County, and many of the neighbouring towns and cities. (Map)
Manitoba settlements included Stuartburn, Manitoba (August 1896), Dauphin, Manitoba (September 1896). Interlake, Manitoba (June 1897), Shoal Lake, Manitoba (April 1899) and Whitemouth, Manitoba.
Saskatchewan settlements were in the Montmartre-Candiac area (1895–96), the Yorkton–Canora–Preeceville area in eastern Saskatchewan, the Rosthern–Yellow Creek–Cudworth area north of Saskatoon and the Radisson–Hafford–Whitkow area east of North Battleford.

French
These include French Canadians from Quebec, French Americans, and Francophones from France, Belgium, and Switzerland.

Alberta

British Columbia

Manitoba

Saskatchewan

German

German settlement began in the prairie provinces in the 1890s and continued until the 1920s during the homesteading period. Some also came to the region after the end of World War II. Canadians of German ethnicity remain numerous in the prairie provinces. Most of these settlers were Catholics and Lutherans, with minorities of Mennonites and Baptists.

German colonies
St. Joseph's Colony (Katharinental) was established from 1886-1904 in southern Saskatchewan.

St. Joseph's Colony (Josephstal) was established in 1905 in west-central Saskatchewan. Villages in this Saskatchewan colony included

St. Peter's Colony in Saskatchewan. founded in 1903 in Saskatchewan was 4,662 square kilometres (1,800 square miles) in size. It included 50 townships; townships 35 to 40, ranges 18 to 22, and townships 37 to 41, ranges 23 to 26 of the Dominion Land Survey west of the 2nd Meridian. 8,000 settlers had arrived in the colony by 1910 and by 1930 it was home to 18,000 Roman Catholics. Most were German Catholics.
Between 1903 and 1925 parishes were established at

Indigenous

Métis 
Some French settlements were founded by Francophone Métis from the Red River settlement in Manitoba. Many began as Métis hivernants buffalo hunting camps from the 1840s to the 1870s.

Scandinavian

Danish

Icelandic 

 Vatnabyggd was an Icelandic settlement of about 2,000 square kilometres in Saskatchewan south of Fishing Lake and the Quill Lakes. By 1911 it had attracted over 1,600 Icelanders. Vatnabyggd included the settlements of Kristnes, Saskatchewan (1903), Dafoe (1905), Kandahar (1905), Wynyard (1904), Mozart (1903), Elfros (1903), Leslie (1907), Holar, Saskatchewan (1905), Mount Hecla, Saskatchewan (1904) and Foam Lake (1892). (Map)
Near Churchbridge, Saskatchewan were the settlements of Thingvalla-Logberg and Vallar
New Iceland (Nýja Ísland) (1875-1897) was located on the southwest shore of Lake Winnipeg in Manitoba. The Rural Municipality of Gimli and the Rural Municipality of Bifrost are within the old settlement area. New Iceland contained the settlements of Gimli, Riverton, Hnausa and Arborg. (Map)
Other Icelandic settlements in Manitoba included Baldur, Erickson, Geysir, Manitoba, Glenboro, Lakeview, Manitoba, Lundar, Morden and Reykjavik
 Markerville, Alberta

Norwegian

Swedish

See also
 List of named ethnic enclaves in North American cities
 Colonia (United States)
 Indian reserve

References

Further reading
 Alan Anderson, "Ethnic Bloc Settlements," Encyclopedia of Saskatchewan (2006) online
 Paul Robert Magocsi, ed. Encyclopedia of Canada's Peoples (1999)

External links
 The Atlas of Saskatchewan provides a map of the entire province showing all major ethnic bloc settlements.
 Government of Alberta's Heritage Department's page about the history of the Ukrainian settlements in East-Central Alberta
 Ukrainian Cultural Heritage Village is a living history village 50 km east of Edmonton, Alberta which focuses on the experiences of Ukrainian immigrants and the block settlements.
Multicultural Canada (Encyclopedia of Canada's Peoples)

Settlement schemes in Canada
Linguistic geography of Canada